Mansor is a surname. Notable people with the surname include:

Azhar Mansor (born 1958), the first Malaysian solo sailor
Shaziman Abu Mansor (born 1964), Malaysian UMNO politician, Works Minister of Malaysia
Tengku Adnan Tengku Mansor (born 1950), Malaysian politician

See also
Sultan Mansor Shah Secondary School (SMSS) (known as SMKSMS) was founded on January 1, 1965